Three ships of the Royal Navy have borne the name HMS Wolfe, after General James Wolfe, victor of the Battle of the Plains of Abraham in 1759. A fourth was laid down but never launched:

 was a 20-gun sloop on the Great Lakes. She was launched in 1813, renamed HMS Montreal in 1814 and was sold in 1832.
HMS Wolfe was to have been a 104-gun  first rate. She was laid down in 1814 but was cancelled in 1831, with the hull being destroyed on the stocks in a storm in 1832.
HMS Wolfe was a  monitor, built as Sir James Wolfe and Wolfe before being named  before her launch in 1915. She was sold in 1921.
 was an armed merchant cruiser requisioned in August 1939, formerly the passenger ship SS Montcalm. She was purchased and converted into a submarine depot ship in 1942 and was broken up in 1952.

See also

Royal Navy ship names